Mesoscia pusilla is a moth of the Megalopygidae family. It was described by Caspar Stoll in 1782.

References

Moths described in 1782
Megalopygidae